Tassie Tigers is an Australian field hockey club based in Hobart, Tasmania. The club joined the Australian Hockey League in 1992 as a men's team. In 2019, the Tassie Tigers expanded to encompass both Tasmanian men's and women's teams, Tassie Van Demons, as one of 7 clubs to compete in Hockey Australia's new premier domestic competition, Hockey One.

Tassie Tigers will compete in the inaugural season of Hockey One, which will be contested from late September through to mid November 2019.

In 2014 the Tigers became the AHL champions, drawing 2-2 with the WA Thundersticks in the gold medal game, but eventually winning 3-2 in penalty shoot-outs.

Home Stadium 
Tassie Tigers are based out of the Tasmanian Hockey Centre in Tasmania's capital city, Hobart. Throughout the Hockey One league, Tassie Tigers will play a number of home games at the stadium.

Teams

Men's team
Details and team rosters to be confirmed.

Women's team
Details and team rosters to be confirmed.

History

Awards

Individual
Player of the Tournament:
Todd Williams - 1993
Daniel Sproule - 1998
Matthew Wells (2) - 2001, 2003
Zain Wright  - 2002
Eddie Ockenden (4) - 2011, 2013, 2014, 2015

Tournament Highest Goalscorer:
Craig Keegan (2) - 1999 (15 Goals), 2000 (10 Goals)
Marcus Richardson - 2007 (12 Goals)
Eddie Ockenden - 2011 (11 Goals)
Kieron Arthur - 2017 (9 Goals)

Player of the Final:
Tristan Clemons - 2014

Team
Tournament Champions:
2014

Play the Whistle Award:
2014, 2015

References

Australian field hockey clubs
Sporting clubs in Tasmania
Field hockey clubs established in 2019
2019 establishments in Australia
Hockey One